Conrad Nicholson Hilton Jr. (July 6, 1926 – February 5, 1969) was an American socialite, hotel heir, and businessman. He was the eldest son of Hilton Hotels founder Conrad Hilton and the first husband of actress Elizabeth Taylor.

Life and career

Conrad Hilton Jr. was born in Dallas, Texas. His father, Conrad Hilton, was the founder of Hilton Hotels, and his mother was Mary Adelaide Barron. Hilton grew up with three younger siblings: William Barron Hilton, Eric Michael Hilton and Constance Francesca Hilton. He is the great-uncle of Paris Hilton and Nicky Hilton.

Growing up he did not take interest in the family business and he dropped out of Loyola University in Los Angeles to join the Navy. His father enrolled him at École hôtelière de Lausanne in Lausanne, Switzerland but he was suspended after six months. In his later years, he was a director and chairman of the executive committee of the Hilton International Company.

Hilton died at the age of 42 from a sudden heart attack due to alcoholism on February 5, 1969. His funeral was held at St. Paul's Church in Los Angeles. He is interred in Holy Cross Cemetery in Culver City, California.

Personal life 
Hilton had an affair with his stepmother, Zsa Zsa Gabor, in 1944, according to claims made by Gabor after his death.

In October 1949, Hilton met Elizabeth Taylor at Mocambo nightclub in Los Angeles. The couple were married at the Church of the Good Shepherd in Beverly Hills on May 6, 1950. They had a tempestuous 8-month marriage due to his gambling, drinking, heroin addiction, and abusive behavior." During one of his violent outbursts, Hilton kicked Taylor in the stomach and caused her to have a miscarriage. Taylor announced their separation in December 1950; she was granted a divorce on grounds of mental cruelty on January 29, 1951.

In September 1951, actress Betsy von Furstenberg announced her engagement to Hilton but they never wed. 

Hilton gained a reputation for being a playboy and becoming violent when he was intoxicated. In May 1954, Hilton was arrested on a drunk charge.

Hilton dated various actresses such as Terry Moore, Mamie Van Doren, Arlene Solof, and Jeanne Carmen. In 1957, he dated actresses Natalie Wood and Joan Collins. Shortly after, he dated Mexican actress Silvia Pinal, whom he met at the opening of a hotel in Acapulco.

In 1958, Hilton married Patricia McClintock, an oil heiress from Oklahoma. They had two sons, Conrad Nicholson Hilton III and Michael Otis Hilton. Their marriage deteriorated as Hilton came addicted to the sleeping pill Seconal and mixed it with hard liquor. McClintock filed for divorce from Hilton on February 10, 1964, which was granted in 1965.

References

Further reading
 Los Angeles Times, Historical Collection

1926 births
1969 deaths
American hoteliers
American people of Norwegian descent
American socialites
Burials at Holy Cross Cemetery, Culver City
Conrad Hilton family
Hilton Worldwide
People from Dallas
Alcohol-related deaths in California
20th-century American businesspeople